Marcus James Jordan (born December 24, 1990) is an American former college basketball player who played for the UCF Knights men's basketball team. He is the second oldest son of retired Hall of Fame basketball player Michael Jordan.

Personal life
Jordan was born December 24, 1990, to Michael Jordan and Juanita Vanoy. He has an older brother, Jeffrey, a younger sister Jasmine and younger paternal twin half-sisters Ysabel and Victoria. Marcus grew up in Highland Park, Illinois.

In 2010, while a college sophomore and underage, Jordan tweeted about spending approximately $50,000 at nightclubs in Las Vegas, prompting an investigation by the Nevada Gaming Control Board. In 2012, Jordan was arrested after a drunken argument with two women outside a hotel in Omaha. He was charged with disorderly conduct, resisting arrest, and obstructing justice, then released. Jordan later pled no contest to disturbing the peace and paid a fine of $250 plus court costs.

Jordan opened a high-end sneaker store named the "Trophy Room" in May of 2016. Located in the Disney Springs retail area of Disney World in Orlando, Florida, the store closed and the business transitioned to online-only sales three years later.

Basketball career

High school
Marcus Jordan originally played high school basketball with his older brother Jeffrey Jordan at Loyola Academy in Wilmette, Illinois. In Marcus's sophomore year, the pair led the school to the conference championships and the best season in school history.

Jordan transferred to Whitney Young Magnet High School in Chicago for his junior and senior seasons. He led the Whitney Young Dolphins to the Illinois 4A Championship in 2009, scoring a game-high 19 points in a 69–66 victory over Waukegan. He also was named the state tournament's most valuable player. Upon his 2009 graduation, Jordan was rated by ESPNU as the 60th-best high school senior shooting guard in the country, averaging 10.0 points, 4.5 rebounds, and 3.2 assists per game.

College
Marcus Jordan played college basketball at the University of Central Florida in Orlando, Florida.  During his freshman year, UCF was in the final year of a five-year contract with Adidas, but Jordan insisted on wearing Nike Air Jordan shoes out of loyalty to his father. This eventually prompted Adidas to terminate its sponsorship deal with UCF.

Jordan scored 8.0 points per game in his true freshman year in 2009–10 and scored 1152 points in his college career. 
On November 12, 2010, the opening game of the 2010–11 season, Jordan led UCF to victory against University of West Florida scoring a career high 28 points on 8–11 field-goal shooting and 5–7 from the 3-point line. He also had a team-high 18 points in upsetting number-16 ranked Florida on December 1, 2010.

In August 2012, Jordan left the UCF basketball team, following in the footsteps of his brother, Jeffrey, who departed the team in January of the same year, but he continued to take classes at the school. He graduated in 2013 with a degree in hospitality management.

References

External links
 Marcus Jordan on scout.com
 Marcus Jordan on rivals.com
 Marcus Jordan on ESPN
 Loyola Academy's Basketball Page
 University of Central Florida's Men's Basketball Page
 Marcus Jordan's University of Central Florida's Men's Basketball Profile

1990 births
Living people
African-American basketball players
American men's basketball players
Basketball players from Chicago
People from Highland Park, Illinois
Shooting guards
Sportspeople from Cook County, Illinois
UCF Knights men's basketball players
Whitney M. Young Magnet High School alumni